Giles Cooper may refer to:
 Giles Cooper (playwright) (1918–1966), Anglo-Irish playwright and radio dramatist
 Giles Cooper (producer), British entertainment producer, concert promoter and marketer
 Giles Cooper (actor) (born 1982), British actor